Joyride is the fourth album by the singer/songwriter Lida Husik, released in 1995 through Caroline Records.

Production
The album was partly recorded at WGNS Studio, in Washington, D.C.

Critical reception
MusicHound Rock: The Essential Album Guide called the album "one of the lost mini-masterpieces of the '90s." Trouser Press wrote that "between the intricate vocal arrangements, the endless attractive music and Husik’s inventive playing, Joyride is the pinnacle of her pop art." The Washington Post called the album "wispily psychedelic," writing that "there's little tension in its evocation of altered-state bliss." Billboard wrote that "Husik's soft, sensual alto ... rises above the current bumper crop of girly voices." CMJ New Music Monthly called it "a remarkably fluid song-cycle of sublety."

Track listing

Personnel
Musicians
Sven Abow – drums on "Glorious"
John Giesecke – drums
Lida Husik – vocals, guitar, bass guitar, organ, illustrations
Julius Klepacz – drums on "Strawberries Are Growing in My Garden" and "Persinthia Lawdro & John"
Mick Murphy – additional vocals on "Strawberries Are Growing in My Garden"
Jay Spiegel – drums on "Mother Richard, "Midnight of Life" and "Micky Minnie"
Charles Steck – bass guitar
Production and additional personnel
Jim De Barros – design
Richard Brown – production
John Falls – photography, design
Beaumont Hannant – production
Kurt Ralske – production
Geoff Turner – production

References

1995 albums
Caroline Records albums
Lida Husik albums